Utra may refer to:

 1447 Utra, asteroid
 E-UTRA, radio standard
 Utra (beetle), a genus of beetles in the subfamily Prioninae
 Utra Janubi, village in Pakistan